Vinayaka Mission's Research Foundation is a UGC, Government of India recognized private deemed-to-be-university located in Salem, Tamil Nadu, India. In 2015, the university was accredited by National Assessment and Accreditation Council.

History
VMRF had its inception in 1981 with the establishment of the Thirumuruga Kirupananda Variyar Thavathiru Sundara Swamigal (TKVTSS) Medical Educational and Charitable Trust. In 1982, the founder-chairman, Dr. A Shanmugasundaram, instituted the Vinayaka Mission's College of Pharmacy in Salem, the pioneer institution of Vinayaka Missions. In 2001, "deemed to be university"  status was conferred on Vinayaka Missions by the Ministry of Human Resources Development, Government of India.

Nearly 15,000 students study in the various constituent colleges, and every year approximately 2,000 medical, dental, homeopathy, paramedical, engineering and management professionals besides arts and science graduates graduate from the VMRF campuses.

Honours 
On 6 July 2008, VMRF chancellor Dr. A. Shanmuga Sundaram conferred an honorary doctorate in philosophy on the MIC deputy president Datuk Seri G. Palanivel for his contribution to politics and the Indian community in Malaysia.

References

External links

Deemed universities in India
Universities in Tamil Nadu
Business schools in Tamil Nadu
Education in Salem, Tamil Nadu
Educational institutions established in 1981
1981 establishments in Tamil Nadu